Arancio may refer to:
 
Lago Arancio, lake in Sicily
Orazio Arancio (born 1967), Italian rugby player